Local elections were held in the Manila on May 10, 2010, within the Philippine general election. The voters will elect for the elective local posts in the city: the mayor, vice mayor, the six Congressmen, and the councilors, six in each of the city's six legislative districts.

Mayoral and vice mayoral election

2007
In the 2007 election, Mayor of Manila Lito Atienza was barred from seeking a fourth consecutive term; his son Ali was named nominee of the Liberal Party; then senator and former mayor Alfredo Lim was named nominee of the Pwersa ng Masang Pilipino (PMP), Kapayapaan, Kaunlaran at Katarungan, Lim's own party and the United Opposition. The Koalisyong Asenso Manileño, the PDP–Laban and Kabalikat ng Bayan sa Kaunlaran o KABAKA nominated vice mayor Danilo Lacuna for the mayoral election. Lim won with 55% of the vote and gave up his senate seat to serve as mayor. Lim was later expelled from the PMP, and Atienza lost the Liberal Party leadership election to senator Mar Roxas and those opposing Gloria Macapagal Arroyo; Atienza created a splinter group of Liberals who are loyal to Arroyo but the Supreme Court ruled that Roxas' election was legal. This caused Atienza to quit the Liberal Party; meanwhile, Roxas gave way to senator Benigno Aquino III, whose mother former president Corazon Aquino, was one of Lim's strongest allies.

2010
Presidential adviser to the peace process Avelino Razon announced his candidacy on August 9 at the Ninoy Aquino Stadium running for the We Are the Reason Movement, under the Nationalist People's Coalition.

Incumbents mayor Alfredo Lim and vice mayor Isko Moreno announced their candidacy for mayor on Moreno's birthday party at the Rizal Memorial Coliseum on October 25, hosted by German Moreno (no relation to Isko), a known Lim ally and Isko's mentor. Moreno, despite being backed by the Asenso Manileño party, will be Lim's running mate.

Former three-term mayor and current Environment and Natural Resources secretary Lito Atienza is expected run to reclaim his seat. Atienza has Ma. Lourdes "Bonjay" Isip-Garcia as his vice mayoral running mate. Bonjay Isip is a Councilor of the 6th District and is now running for vice mayor. Isip first won as Councilor in 1992 and later became both Deputy City Administrator and City Administrator. Isip in 1992, was the youngest elected councilor in Manila's history.

Lito Atienza served as mayor from 1998 to 2007. Atienza served as Lim's running mate when Lim served as mayor from 1992 to 1998. Rep. Amado Bagatsing, of the Asenso Manileño party, bolted and joined Atienza's ship. Meanwhile, Lim will support the Liberal Party national ticket of Benigno Aquino III and Mar Roxas, while holding his own Kapayapaan, Kaunlaran at Katarungan (Peace, Prosperity and Justice) standard; Moreno will support the Nacionalista Party ticket headed by Manuel Villar.

After announcement of the Lim-Moreno ticket, former Philippine National Police chief Avelino Razon announced that he had chosen Moreno as his running mate. After Moreno's announcement that he will run under Lim's banner, at least six councilors bolted from Asenso Manileño and went to Razon's side. Moreno eventually became a guest candidate in Razon's ticket, as his vice mayoral candidate.

The primary issue for the upcoming campaign is the retention of the oil depots at Pandacan. Lim and Moreno supported its retention while Atienza and Bagatsing supported its removal.

Atienza, leader of the Liberal Party wing not recognized by both the Commission on Elections and the Supreme Court, will be the "guest candidate" of the Joseph Estrada-led Pwersa ng Masang Pilipino (PMP). Atienza, a Gloria Macapagal Arroyo supporter, has maintained cordial relations with Estrada. In the end, Atienza's certificate of candidacy stated that he was nominated by the Liberal Party, but under the "Buhayin ang MayniLA" (Revive Manila) ticket, and as a guest candidate of the PMP. His guest candidacy was later upgraded to a full-fledged nomination by the PMP as announced by the party's director for political affairs.

Results
The candidates for mayor and vice mayor with the highest number of votes wins the seat; they are voted separately, therefore, they may be of different parties when elected.

Mayoral election results
Parties are as stated in their certificate of candidacies.

Notes:
Lim's KKK party is in coalition with the Liberal Party.
Atienza is belatedly nominated by Pwersa ng Masang Pilipino; he is indicated as an independent on the ballot.
Razon's We Are the Reason Movement slate are guest candidates of the Nationalist People's Coalition and Lakas Kampi CMD.
"Change" is compared from 2007 based on the candidates; in 2007, Atienza ran under the Liberal Party and in 2010 ran under the PMP, while Lim ran in 2007 under the PMP and moved to the Liberal-backed KKK in 2010.

Vice mayoral election results
Parties are as stated in their certificate of candidacies.

Moreno's Asenso Manileño party is in coalition with the Nacionalista Party, and is a candidate of Lim's KKK and a "guest candidate" Razon's We Are the Reason Movement.

Congressional elections
Each of Manila's six legislative districts elects one representative to the House of Representatives. The candidate with the highest number of votes wins the seat.

1st District
Incumbent Benjamin Asilo is also co-nominated by the KKK. Arlene Koa is co-nominated by Asenso Manileño. Former representative Ernesto Nieva, who was supposed to run again under Lakas-Kampi-CMD, died on February 16, 2010, due to cardiac arrest. His daughter Mina was designated as a candidate by substitution.

2nd District
Jaime Lopez of Lakas Kampi CMD is the incumbent, but he is ineligible for re-election since he is on his third consecutive term already. His party didn't nominate anyone in this district; his son Carlo is co-nominated by the Liberal Party and the KKK.

3rd District
Zenaida Angping is the incumbent.

4th District
Trisha Bonoan-David is the incumbent.

5th District
Despite under Atienza's Buhayin ang MayniLA ticket, which is supported by the Joseph Estrada-led Pwersa ng Masang Pilipino, incumbent Amado Bagatsing is the nominee of both Lakas-Kampi-CMD and local party KABAKA. Latest election results can be viewed at https://web.archive.org/web/20100513150537/http://electionresults.comelec.gov.ph/res_reg3900000.html

6th District
Despite under Atienza's Buhayin ang MayniLA ticket, which is supported by the Joseph Estrada-led Pwersa ng Masang Pilipino, incumbent Benny M. Abante is Lakas-Kampi-CMD's nominee in the district.

Danilo Lacuna is also co-nominated by  Asenso Manileño.

This is currently under protest.

City Council elections
Each of Manila's six legislative districts sends six councilors to the City Council. The election is via plurality-at-large voting: A voter can vote up to six candidates; the six candidates with the highest number of votes in a particular district are elected.

In addition, the barangay captains and the Sangguniang Kabataan (SK) chairpersons  in the city's barangays (communities) elect amongst themselves a president that will seat as an ex officio member of the city council with full voting powers. The presidents of the barangay captains and SK chairpersons that were elected after the 2007 barangay elections will serve until the winners of the 2010 barangay elections are seated in late November.

In case of a tie vote, the vice mayor, as the presiding officer, will vote to break the tie.

Summary

1st District

|-
|bgcolor=black colspan=5|

2nd District

|-
|bgcolor=black colspan=5|

3rd District

|-
|bgcolor=black colspan=5|

4th District

|-
|bgcolor=black colspan=5|

5th District

|-
|bgcolor=black colspan=5|

6th District

|-
|bgcolor=black colspan=5|

Reaction
Lim won the election with more than 250,000 votes clear of Atienza, his nearest rival. After his proclamation on the afternoon of May 12, Lim thanked the Manileños for their support, as Razon conceded to Lim as early as before midnight of May 10. Atienza said that he will contest the result of election as the results did not match the random manual audit of the ballots. Moreno had an even easier time against his nearest rival, Bonjay Isip-Garcia as he won with a margin of almost 380,000 votes.

Atienza put the result under protest. The Commission on Elections' First Division dismissed Atienza's protest on September 13, 2011, confirmed later by the commission en banc, saying that votes included within Atienza's protest would not be enough to overtake Lim's lead. Atienza subsequently withdrew his protest on January 11, 2013.

References

Manila
2010
Politics of Manila
2010 elections in Metro Manila